Two ships of the Royal Navy have been named HMS Blackmore, named after Blackmore, Essex:

 The first , launched in 1917 was a minesweeper that served in World War I.
 The second , was a  that served in World War II and was sold to the Royal Danish Navy in 1958.

Royal Navy ship names